1l or 1-L may refer to:
first-line medical treatment, 1L treatment, first-line therapy (2L, 3L, etc.)
Marawing 1-L Malamut, Czech ultralight aircraft
Toyota 1L
Volkswagen 1-litre car
First year law school student in the United States
Liberland radio prefix

See also
L1 (disambiguation)